Paphiopedilum kolopakingii is a species of orchid endemic to Borneo (central Kalimantan). Named after A. Kolopaking.

References

External links 

kolopakingii
Endemic orchids of Indonesia
Orchids of Borneo